Bremen Hauptbahnhof (German for Bremen main station) is a railway station in the city of Bremen in northwestern Germany. It is the most important rail station for both the city and state of Bremen; InterCityExpress, Intercity, EuroCity, CityNightLine and DB NachtZug services call at the station, which is situated to the Northeast of the city centre. The train services are operated by Deutsche Bahn, NordWestBahn, Metronom and Erixx.

History 
Bremen's first train station was opened in 1847 on the site of today's station, on the line to Hanover. Later, lines leading to Vegesack (Bremen-Vegesack–Bremen line), Bremerhaven (then Wesermünde, Bremen–Bremerhaven line), Oldenburg and Uelzen  (Uelzen–Langwedel railway) were connected to the station. In 1870, the Köln-Mindener Eisenbahn, opening its Wanne-Eickel–Hamburg line (Rollbahn), built another station some hundred metres north of the old station, since the old station could not cope with the additional Rollbahn traffic. Eventually, it was decided that a single station would be better, and so today's station was built from 1886 to 1891 after plans by Hubert Stier, with sculptures by Diedrich Samuel Kropp and Carl Dopmeyer. In 1907, additional tracks were added. Whilst the station hall has been remodeled several times due to war damage and modernisation, its basic outline still resembles the original 1880s building.

The station hall was thoroughly renovated in the late 1990s and early 2000s, merging the two formerly separated passenger tunnels into a single concourse. Since 1973, it is protected by the monument protection act. The station's platforms, however, were only partially renovated, but are expected to be refurbished from 2008 on for €12.6 million.

Train services
The following services currently call at the station:

Intercity Express services (ICE 10) Oldenburg - Bremen - Hanover - Berlin
Intercity Express services (ICE 25) Bremen - Hanover - Kassel - Würzburg - München
Intercity Express services (ICE 42) Hamburg - Bremen - Münster - Dortmund - Wuppertal - Köln - Frankfurt - Stuttgart - Ulm - München
EuroCity services (EC 7) Hamburg - Bremen - Münster - Dortmund - Düsseldorf - Köln - Bonn - Karlsruhe - Freiburg - Basel - Zürich 
Intercity services (IC 30) Hamburg - Bremen - Münster - Essen - Düsseldorf - Köln - Bonn - Stuttgart
Intercity services (IC 31) Hamburg - Bremen - Münster - Dortmund - Wuppertal - Köln - Bonn - Frankfurt
Intercity services (IC 56) Norddeich - Emden - Oldenburg - Bremen - Hanover - Braunschweig - Magdeburg - Leipzig - Dresden
Regional services  Norddeich - Emden - Oldenburg - Bremen - Nienburg - Hanover
Regional services  Bremen - Rotenburg - Buchholz - Hamburg
Regional services  Bremerhaven-Lehe - Bremen - Nienburg - Hanover
Regional services  Bremerhaven-Lehe - Bremen - Osnabrück
Local services  Der Heidesprinter Bremen - Soltau - Uelzen
Local services  Bremen - Rotenburg - Tostedt - Buchholz - Hamburg
Local services  Osnabrück - Bramsche - Vechta - Delmenhorst - Bremen
Bremen S-Bahn services  Bremen-Farge - Bremen-Vegesack - Bremen - Verden
Bremen S-Bahn services  Bremerhaven-Lehe - Osterholz-Scharmbeck - Bremen - Twistringen
Bremen S-Bahn services  Bad Zwischenahn - Oldenburg - Delmenhorst - Bremen
Bremen S-Bahn services  Nordenham - Hude - Delmenhorst - Bremen

Operational usage 
The station sees 100 long-distance and 410 regional trains per day. About 100,000 passengers per day use the station.
The station features nine platform tracks, of which seven are in the station hall. In the hall, two tracks serve as through tracks for freight traffic. The station is electrified since 1964 and has been thoroughly modernised during the late 1990s. Both the passenger and mail subways, which used to be separate, were joined together and the station's subway now features a rich selection of shops and food halls, akin to a shopping mall. The platforms have been partly modernised as well (most notably platforms 5 and 6, which carry most of the southbound long distance traffic), and lifts have been put in.
Trains usually depart from:
 Track 1 - Osnabrück (Wanne-Eickel–Hamburg line)
 Track 2 - Oldenburg (Oldenburg–Bremen line), Nordenham (Hude–Blexen line)
 Track 5 - Verden, Hanover (Bremen–Hanover line)
 Track 6 - Bremerhaven (Bremen–Bremerhaven line)
 Track 7 - Osnabrück (Intercity), Diepholz (Wanne-Eickel–Hamburg line)
 Track 8 - Hamburg (Wanne-Eickel–Hamburg line), Uelzen (Uelzen–Langwedel line)
 Track 9 - Hamburg (Metronom, Wanne-Eickel–Hamburg line)
 Track 10 - Rotenburg (Wanne-Eickel–Hamburg line)

The station is connected to the Bremen tramway network operated by BSAG by a large, six-track tram station in front of the main hall.

Decorations 

The sculptures on the façade, among other railway-related symbolisms, depict the coats of arms of the cities of Bremen and Hamburg, the original destinations of the line.

There is a large mural inside the station's main hall, dating back to the 1950s and showing scenes from the city port. It went into oblivion when it was drywalled off and station announcement boards were put over it in the 1970s, but has been carefully renovated at the station's most recent interior overhaul and is now viewable to the public again.

See also
List of railway stations in Bremen

References

External links

Official Website
 See the Ticket Hall in a 360 degrees interactive panorama (Flash) 

Buildings and structures in Bremen (city)
Railway stations in Bremen (state)
Transport in Bremen (city)
Railway stations in Germany opened in 1847
History of Bremen (city)
Baroque Revival architecture in Germany
Renaissance Revival architecture in Germany
Romanesque Revival railway stations in Germany